Microsoft Office Live is a discontinued web-based service providing document sharing and website creation tools for consumers and small businesses. Its successor was branded Windows Live. Office Live consisted of two services, Office Live Workspace, which was superseded by OneDrive, and Office Live Small Business, which was superseded by Office 365.

Office Live Workspace
Office Live Workspace was a free service for storing and sharing documents online.  The company claimed it was most commonly used for work, school, and home projects because documents could be managed from remote locations without a flash drive. The service required web access and a compatible browser; the interface was available in over 25 languages. Certain functionalities were tied to a browser plug-in called Silverlight, reducing the portability of the service in comparison to other providers of online office suites. In order for workspaces to be accessed directly from Office, users of Word, Excel, and PowerPoint needed to install an Office Live Update. Files couldn't be edited from within a workspace, but clicking on "edit" would open them up in Microsoft Office. The workspace didn't offer offline collaboration — instead documents were "checked out" and "checked in" — but the service did integrate with SharedView for real-time screen sharing.

Features
 Online storage – Office Live permits users to save up to 5 gigabytes (GB) of information in many file formats from Microsoft, which can be accessed from any computer with an internet connection, even if Office isn't installed. The company claims this replaces the need for flash drives or CDs as a storage solution, and provides capabilities for updating project schedules, organizing events, and delegating assignments without scheduling a meeting or relying on email
Information sharing – Office Live Workspace is designed so that computer users can share a single document or a workspace containing multiple documents, as well as collaborate online as a group.  Workspaces are password-protected and users can control who views and edits information. Files or workspaces can be shared with up to 100 people
Software compatibility – While Office Live Workspace works with Microsoft Office programs such as Word, Excel, PowerPoint, and Outlook, it also allows users to store documents of other file types. If the Office Live update is installed, files and documents may be opened and saved directly from Microsoft Office XP, 2003, 2007 or 2008 for Mac. Users may also synchronize, contact, task, and event lists with Outlook 2003 and 2007, and workspace lists can be exported to Excel. The Office Live update is no longer available for download from Microsoft and is not supported.
Resources and support – Microsoft established a Community Support website, which includes a blog, wiki, how-to videos, and the opportunity for customers to ask and answer questions about using Office Live Workspace

System requirements
Office Live Workspace requires an Internet-connected computer running Windows XP, Windows Server 2003, Windows Vista, Windows 7, or Mac OS X 10.2.x and later.  It works with the following browsers:
Internet Explorer 6.0 or later
Firefox 2.0 or later
Safari 3.0 or later
Office Live Workspace is currently not supported on Office 2010.  In May 2010, it was announced that Office Live Workspace customers would be moved to Microsoft's OneDrive, service, which offered 25GB of storage and was reduced down to 7GB in 2012 and the ability to view and edit documents through Office Web Apps.

See also
Comparison of office suites

References

External links
 Official website (Archive)
Office Live Workspace Community
Office Live Small Business Community
Microsoft Office Live Developer Portal

Office Live
Office Live